|}

|- 
| class="jockey_colours_year_cell" colspan="3" style="border:1px solid black; border-top:2px solid black; border-bottom: none; background-color:#FECCE7;" | 2012 - waterlogged

The Pipalong  Stakes is a Listed flat horse race in Great Britain open to mares and fillies aged four years or older.
It is run at Pontefract over a distance of 1 mile and 6 yards (1,615 metres), and it is scheduled to take place each year in July.

The race was first run in 2003.

Records
Leading jockey (2 wins):
Ben Curtis – Nakuti (2015), Clon Coulis (2018)
Robert Winston – Red Bloom (2005), Bahia Breeze (2006)
 Ryan Moore -  Romola (2020), Lights On (2021)
 Daniel Tudhope -  Lincoln Rocks (2017), Thunder Beauty (2022) 

Leading trainer (3 wins):
Sir Michael Stoute – Red Bloom (2005), Romola (2020), Lights On (2021)

Winners

See also
 Horse racing in Great Britain
 List of British flat horse races

References
Racing Post:

Flat races in Great Britain
Pontefract Racecourse
Mile category horse races for fillies and mares
Recurring sporting events established in 2003
2003 establishments in England